Ye Guangfu (born September 1980) is a Chinese fighter pilot and People's Liberation Army Astronaut Corps (PLAAC) taikonaut selected as part of the Shenzhou program.

Biography 
Ye was born in Shuangliu District, Chengdu, Sichuan in September 1980.

Career 
As a People's Liberation Army Air Force pilot, Ye spent four years as an instructor and four years as a jet fighter pilot and amassed a total of 1,100 hours of flight time. He was selected to join the second batch of Chinese astronauts in 2010 and qualified in 2014.

Ye made his first public appearance after participating in the ESA CAVES mission of 2016 organised by the ESA, making him the first Chinese participant of such an event.

He was part of the backup crew for Shenzhou 12, and has been selected to fly on Shenzhou 13 to the Tiangong space station.

On 26 November 2021, Ye and Shenzhou 13 commander Zhai Zhigang carried out the second EVA of the mission, marking Ye's first spacewalk and Zhai's third.

Personal life 
Ye is married and has two children. 

Apart from his native language Chinese, he is also fluent in English and Russian.

See also 
 List of Chinese astronauts

References

External links 
Spacefacts biography of Ye Guangfu

Shenzhou program astronauts
People's Liberation Army Astronaut Corps
Living people
People's Liberation Army Air Force personnel
1980 births
Spacewalkers